Tianmu may refer to the following in mainland China or Taiwan:

Tianmu, Shilin District (天母), a neighbourhood of Shilin District, Taipei, Taiwan
Tianmu Mountain (天目山) in Lin'an City, Zhejiang, China
Tianmu, Tianjin (天穆镇), a town in Beichen District, Tianjin, China